Lecithocera cornutella is a moth in the family Lecithoceridae. It was described by Francis Walker in 1864. It is found in Sri Lanka.

Adults are cinereous-fawn colour, with the wings long, narrow and shining. The forewings are somewhat rounded at the tips, with the exterior border extremely oblique. The hindwings are whitish cinereous.

References

Moths described in 1864
cornutella